The Tajikistan Federation of Trade Unions (TFTU), is a national trade union center in Tajikistan. It is the successor to the Soviet trade union system and claims a membership of 1.5 million, although a portion of members are found in many enterprises which are not functioning, due to economic conditions.

The TFTU is affiliated with the General Confederation of Trade Unions.

References

Trade unions in Tajikistan
General Confederation of Trade Unions
National federations of trade unions